Wake-robin, wakerobin, or wake robin are used in the common names of several species of flowering plants, including:

 Arum maculatum, a wake-robin (not to be confused with Trillium erectum)
 Pseudotrillium rivale, the brook wakerobin
 Various species of Trillium, including:
 Trillium albidum, the giant white wakerobin
 Trillium angustipetalum, the narrowpetal wakerobin
 Trillium catesbaei, the bashful wakerobin
 Trillium cernuum, a nodding wakerobin (not to be confused with Trillium flexipes)
 Trillium chloropetalum, the giant wakerobin
 Trillium decipiens, the Chattahoochee River wakerobin
 Trillium decumbens, the trailing wakerobin
 Trillium discolor, the mottled wakerobin
 Trillium erectum, a wake robin (not to be confused with Arum maculatum)
 Trillium flexipes, a nodding wakerobin (not to be confused with Trillium cernuum)
 Trillium foetidissimum, the Mississippi River wakerobin
 Trillium gracile, the Sabine River wakerobin
 Trillium grandiflorum, the white wake-robin
 Trillium kurabayashii, the giant purple wakerobin
 Trillium ludovicianum, the Louisiana wakerobin
 Trillium luteum, the yellow wakerobin
 Trillium maculatum, the spotted wakerobin
 Trillium ovatum, the western wakerobin
 Trillium persistens, the persistent wakerobin
 Trillium pusillum, the dwarf wakerobin
 Trillium recurvatum, the prairie wake-robin
 Trillium reliquum, the Confederate wakerobin
 Trillium rugelii, the illscented wakerobin
 Trillium sessile, a sessile-flowered wake-robin (not to be confused with other sessile-flowered trilliums)
 Trillium simile, the jeweled wakerobin
 Trillium stamineum, the Blue Ridge wakerobin
 Trillium sulcatum, the furrowed wakerobin
 Trillium texanum, the Texas wakerobin
 Trillium underwoodii, the longbract wakerobin
 Trillium undulatum, the smiling wake robin, also known as the striped wake-robin
 Trillium vaseyi, the sweet wakerobin
 Trillium viride, the wood wakerobin
 Trillium viridescens, the tapertip wakerobin